There were three main social groups in Tibet prior to 1959, namely ordinary laypeople (mi ser in Tibetan), lay nobility (sger pa), and monks. The ordinary layperson could be further classified as a peasant farmer (shing-pa) or nomadic pastoralist (trokpa).

The Tsangpa Dynasty (1565-1642) and Ganden Phodrang (1642-1950) law codes distinguished three social divisions: high, medium and low. Each in turn was divided into three classes, to give nine classes in all. Social status was a formal classification, mostly hereditary and had legal consequences: for example the compensation to be paid for the killing of a member of these classes varied from 5 (for the lowest) to 200 'sung' for the second highest, the members of the noble families.

Nobles, government officials and monks of pure conduct were in the high division, only – probably – the Dalai Lama was in the very highest class. The middle division contained a large portion of the population and ranged from minor government officials, to taxpayer and landholding peasants, to landless peasants. Social mobility was possible in the middle division. The lower division contained ragyabpa ('untouchables') of different types: e.g. blacksmiths and butchers. The very lowest class contained executioners, and (in the Tsang code) bachelors and hermaphrodites.

Anthropologists have presented different taxonomies for the middle social division, in part because they studied specific regions of Tibet and the terms were not universal. Both Melvyn Goldstein and Geoff Childs however classified the population into three main types:

 taxpayer families (tre-ba or khral-pa)
 householders (du-jong or dud-chung-ba)
 landless peasants (mi-bo)

In the middle group, the taxpaying families could be quite wealthy. Depending upon the district, each category had different responsibilities in terms of tax and labor. Membership to each of these classes was primarily hereditary; the linkage between subjects and their estate and overlord was similarly transmitted through parallel descent. The taxpayer class, although numerically smallest among the three subclasses, occupied a superior position in terms of political and economic status.

The question of whether serfdom prevailed in traditional Tibetan society is controversial;  argues for a moderate position, recognizing that serfdom existed but was not universal in Tibet; a better description of the traditional Tibetan social class system would be a caste system, rather than a comparison to European feudalism.

The Higher Division
The highest of the high class was empty, or only contained possibly the Dalai Lama

The Nobility
The middle class of the high division – the highest attainable in practice – was headed by the hereditary nobility. Yabshi were thought to be descendants of the Dalai Lamas, depon were descendants of the ancient royal families, midak were on a slightly lower level.

There were "a small group of about 30 higher status families" and "120 to 170 lower or 'common' aristocratic families".

High Government and Monk Officials
High government officials were appointed from the aristocracy. Monk officials were usually drawn from Lhasa middle classes, the families of existing monk officials, or were the second sons of the aristocracy. They were usually monks in name only, one night spent in a monastery being sufficient to qualify as a monk for this purpose.

The Middle Division

Taxpayer families
The treba (also tralpa or khral-pa) taxpayers lived in "corporate family units" that hereditarily owned estates leased from their district authority, complete with land titles. Their primary civil responsibility was to pay taxes (tre-ba and khral-pa means "taxpayer"), and to supply corvée services that included both human and animal labor to their district authority. They had a comfortable standard of living. They also frequently practiced polyandry in marriage and other practices to maintain a single marriage per generation and avoid parceling land holdings.

Householders
The householder class (du-jung, dud-chung-ba duiqoin, duiqion, düchung, dudchhung, duigoin or dujung) comprised peasants who held only small plots of land that were legally and literally "individual" possessions. This was different from the taxpayer families who owned land as a familial corporation. Land inheritance rules for the householders were quite different from taxpayer family rules, in that there was no certainty as to whether a plot of land would be inherited by his son. The district authority — either governmental, monastic, or aristocratic — was the ultimate landowner and decided inheritance. Compared to the taxpayer families the householders, however, had lighter tax obligations and only human labor corvée obligations to their district authorities. These obligations, unlike the taxpayer family obligations, fell only on the individual and not on his family.

Landless peasants
Landless peasants (mi-bo) did not have heritable rights to land. They were still obligated to their 'owning' estate under their status as mi-ser. In contrast with the taxpayer families and householders, they had the freedom to go wherever they wanted and could engage in trade or crafts. When farming, they might lease land from taxpayer families and as payment take on work for those families. Like the householders the landless peasants also used resources in their own individual capacity which were non-heritable.

The relative freedom of the mi-bo status was usually purchased by an annual fee to the estate to which the mi-bo belonged. The fee could be raised if the mi-bo prospered, and the lord could still exact special corvée labor, e.g. for a special event.

The status could be revoked at the will of the estate owner. The offspring of the mi-bo did not automatically inherit the status of 'mi-bo', they did inherit the status of 'mi-ser', and could be indentured to service in their earlier teens, or would have to pay their own mi-bo fee.

The Lower Division

Ragyabpa – Untouchables
The ragyabpa or untouchable caste were the lowest level, and they performed the 'unclean' work. This included fishermen, butchers, executioners, corpse disposers, blacksmiths, goldsmiths and prostitutes. Ragyabpa were also divided into three divisions: for instance a goldsmith was in the highest untouchable class, and was not regarded as being as defiled as an executioner, who was in the lowest.

They were regarded as both polluted and polluting, membership of the caste was hereditary, and escape from the untouchable status was not possible.

Nangzan – Household servants
According to Chinese government sources, Nangzan (also nangzen, nangzan, nangsen) were hereditary household servants comprising 5% of the population.

Slavery
According to American sinologist A. Tom Grunfeld there were a few slaves in Tibet. Grunfeld quotes Sir Charles Bell, a British colonial official in the Chumbi Valley in the early 20th century and a Tibet scholar who wrote of slaves in the form of small children being stolen or bought from their parents, too poor to support them, to be brought up and kept or sold as slaves. These children came mostly from south-eastern Tibet and the territories of the tribes that dwelt between Tibet and Assam. Grunfeld omits Bell's elaboration that in 1905, there were "a dozen or two" of these, and that it was "a very mild form of slavery". According to exile Tibetan writer Jamyang Norbu, later accounts from Westerners who visited Tibet and even long-term foreign residents such as Heinrich Harrer, Peter Aufschnaiter, Hugh Richardson and David Macdonald make no mention of any such practice, which suggests that the 13th Dalai Lama must have eliminated this practice altogether in his reforms.

Notes

References
Childs, Geoff. 2003. "Polyandry and population growth in a Historical Tibetan Society", History of the Family, 8:423–444.
French, Rebecca (2002) The Golden Yoke, 
Goldstein, Melvyn C. (1971) "Stratification, Polyandry, and Family Structure in Central Tibet", Southwestern Journal of Anthropology, 27(1): 64–74.
Goldstein, Melvyn C. (1971) Serfdom and Mobility: An Examination of the Institution of "Human Lease" in Traditional Tibetan Society The Journal of Asian Studies, Vol. 30, No. 3, (May, 1971), pp. 521–534
Goldstein, Melvyn C. (1987) 
Goldstein, Melvyn C. A History of Modern Tibet, 1913–1951: The Demise of the Lamaist State (1989) University of California Press. 
Goldstein, Melvyn C. A History of Modern Tibet, 1913–1951: The Demise of the Lamaist State (1989), first Indian edition (1993) Munshiram Manoharlal Publishers, New Delhi,  Pagination is identical to University of California edition.
Grunfeld, A. Tom (1996) The making of Modern Tibet, Revised Edition, Armonk, New York: M. E. Sharpe, xvi + 352 p. 
Grunfield's work, which generally mirrors the Chinese government viewpoint, has been severely criticized by Tibetan critics, see "Acme of Obscenity: Tom Grunfeld and The Making of Modern Tibet" by Jamyang Norbu, 18 August 2008, 
Laird, Thomas (2006) The Story of Tibet''